Ambalema is a municipality in the Tolima department of Colombia.  The population of Ambalema was 7,277 as of the 1993 census.

Municipalities of Tolima Department